Chaudhry Akhtar Abbas Bosal is a Pakistani politician who was a Member of the Provincial Assembly of the Punjab, from August 2013 to May 2018.

Early life 
He was born on 30 November 1973.Born into a landlord jatt family known as king of the bar

Political career
He was elected to the Provincial Assembly of the Punjab as a candidate of Pakistan Muslim League (Nawaz) from Constituency PP-118 (Mandi Bahauddin-III) in by-polls held in August 2013.

References

Living people
Punjab MPAs 2013–2018
1973 births
Pakistan Muslim League (N) politicians